Photobacterium marinum is a gram-negative, oxidase and catalase positive, motile bacteria of the genus Photobacterium. Photobacterium marinum are commonly found in marine environment. S.I. Paul et al. (2021) isolated, characterized and identified Photobacterium marinum from marine sponges of the Saint Martin's Island Area of the Bay of Bengal, Bangladesh.

Biochemical characteristics of Photobacterium marinum 
Colony, morphological, physiological, and biochemical characteristics of Photobacterium marinum are shown in the Table below.

Note: + = Positive; – =Negative; V =Variable (+/–)

References 

Vibrionales
Undescribed species